The Name of the Rose is a 1986 historical mystery film directed by Jean-Jacques Annaud, based on the 1980 novel of the same name by Umberto Eco. Sean Connery stars as the Franciscan friar William of Baskerville, called upon to solve a deadly mystery in a medieval abbey. Christian Slater portrays his young apprentice, Adso of Melk, and F. Murray Abraham his Inquisitor rival, Bernardo Gui. Michael Lonsdale, William Hickey, Feodor Chaliapin Jr., Valentina Vargas, and Ron Perlman play supporting roles.

This English-language film was an international co-production between West German, French, and Italian companies  and was filmed in Rome and at the former Eberbach Abbey in the Rheingau. It received mixed to positive reviews from critics and won several awards, including the BAFTA Award for Best Actor in a Leading Role for Sean Connery. Another adaptation was made in 2019 as a television miniseries for RAI.

Plot

Franciscan friar William of Baskerville and his novice, Adso of Melk, arrive at an early 14th century Benedictine abbey in Northern Italy. A mysterious death has occurred ahead of an important theological Church conference. William, known for his deductive and analytical mind, confronts the worried Abbot and gains permission to investigate the death – a young illuminator appears to have committed suicide. Over the next few days, several other bizarre deaths occur.

William and Adso make the acquaintance of Salvatore, a hunchback who speaks gibberish in various languages, and his handler and protector, Remigio da Varagine. William deduces from Salvatore's speech that he had once been a member of a heretical sect and infers that Salvatore and Remigio may have been involved in the killings. Meanwhile, Adso encounters a beautiful feral peasant girl who snuck into the abbey to trade sexual favors for food, and is seduced by her.

Investigating and keen to head off accusations of demonic possession, the protagonists discover and explore a labyrinthine library in the abbey's forbidden principal tower. William finds that it is "one of the greatest libraries in all Christendom," containing dozens of works by Classical masters such as Aristotle, thought to have been lost for centuries. William deduces that the library is kept hidden because such advanced knowledge, coming from pagan philosophers, is difficult to reconcile with Christianity. William further deduces that all of those who died had read the only remaining copy of Aristotle's Second Book of Poetics.

His investigations are curtailed by the arrival of Bernardo Gui of the Inquisition, summoned for the conference and keen to prosecute those he deems responsible for the deaths. The two men clashed in the past, and the zealous inquisitor has no time for theories outside his own. Salvatore and the girl are found fighting over a black cockerel while in the presence of a black cat. Gui presents this as irrefutable proof that they are in league with Satan and tortures Salvatore into a false confession. Salvatore, Remigio, and the girl are dragged before a tribunal, where Gui intimidates the Abbot into concurring with his judgment of heresy. But William, also "invited" by Gui to serve on the panel of judges, refuses to confirm the accusations of murder, pointing out that the murderer could read Greek, a skill that Remigio doesn't possess. Gui resorts to extracting a confession from Remigio by the threat of torture, and clearly plans to take care of William for good.

When the head Librarian succumbs like the others, William and Adso ascend the forbidden library, and come face to face with the Venerable Jorge, the most ancient denizen of the abbey, with the book, which describes comedy and how it may be used to teach. Believing laughter and jocularity to be instruments of the Devil, Jorge has poisoned the pages to stop the spread of what he considers dangerous ideas: those reading it would ingest the poison as they licked their fingers to aid in turning pages. Confronted, Jorge throws over a candle, starting a blaze that quickly engulfs the library. William insists that Adso flee, as he manages to collect an inadequate armload of invaluable books to save; the volume of Poetics, Jorge, and the rest of the library are lost.

Meanwhile, Salvatore and Remigio have been burned at the stake. The girl has been slated for the same fate but local peasants take advantage of the chaos of the library fire to free her and turn on Gui. Gui attempts to flee but they throw his wagon off a cliff, to his death. William and Adso later take their leave of the Abbey. On the road, Adso is stopped by the girl, silently appealing for him to stay with her, but Adso continues on with William. In his closing narration, a much older Adso reflects that he never regretted his decision, as he learned many more things from William. Adso also states that the girl was the only earthly love of his life, yet he never learned her name.

Cast

 Sean Connery as William of Baskerville
 F. Murray Abraham as Bernardo Gui
 Christian Slater as Adso of Melk
 Dwight Weist as older Adso (voice)
 Helmut Qualtinger as Remigio de Varagine
 Elya Baskin as Severinus
 Michael Lonsdale as The Abbot
 Volker Prechtel as Malachia
 Feodor Chaliapin Jr. as Jorge de Burgos
 William Hickey as Ubertino de Casale
 Michael Habeck as Berengar
 Valentina Vargas as The Girl
 Ron Perlman as Salvatore
 Leopoldo Trieste as Michele da Cesena
 Franco Valobra as Jerome of Kaffa
 Vernon Dobtcheff as Hugh of Newcastle
 Donal O'Brian as Pietro d'Assisi
 Andrew Birkin as Cuthbert of Winchester
 Lucien Bodard as Cardinal Bertrand
 Peter Berling as Jean d'Anneaux
 Pete Lancaster as Bishop of Alborea
 Urs Althaus as Venantius
 Lars Bodin-Jorgensen as Adelmo of Otranto
 Kim Rossi Stuart as a novice

Production

Director Jean-Jacques Annaud once told Umberto Eco that he was convinced the book was written for only one person to direct: himself. He felt personally intrigued by the project and other things because of a lifelong fascination with medieval churches and a great familiarity with Latin and Greek.

Annaud spent four years preparing the film, traveling throughout the United States and Europe, searching for the perfect multi-ethnic cast with interesting and distinctive faces. He resisted suggestions to cast Sean Connery for the part of William because he felt the character, who was already an amalgam of Sherlock Holmes and William of Occam, would become too overwhelming with "007" added. Later, after Annaud failed to find another actor he liked for the part, he was won over by Connery's reading, but Eco was dismayed by the casting choice, and Columbia Pictures pulled out because Connery's career was then in a slump.

Christian Slater was cast through a large-scale audition of teenage boys. (His mother, Mary Jo Slater, was also a prominent casting director who consulted on the film.) For the wordless scene in which the Girl seduces Adso, Annaud allowed Valentina Vargas to lead the scene without his direction. Annaud did not explain to Slater what she would be doing in order to elicit a more authentic performance from the actors.

The exterior and some of the interiors of the monastery seen in the film were constructed as a replica on a hilltop outside Rome and ended up being the biggest exterior set built in Europe since Cleopatra (1963). Many of the interiors were shot at Eberbach Abbey, Germany. Most props, including period illuminated manuscripts, were produced specifically for the film.

Reception
The film was very successful in Germany with a gross of $25 million. However, the film did poorly at the box office in the United States where it played at 176 theaters and grossed $7.2 million. However, it was popular in other parts of Europe (including Italy, France and Spain) and grossed over $77.2 million worldwide.

Roger Ebert gave the film 2.5 stars out of a possible 4, writing "What we have here is the setup for a wonderful movie. What we get is a very confused story...It's all inspiration and no discipline."Time Out gave the film a positive review: "As intelligent a reductio of Umberto Eco's sly farrago of whodunnit and medieval metaphysics as one could have wished for...the film simply looks good, really succeeds in communicating the sense and spirit of a time when the world was quite literally read like a book." The film has a rating of 75% on Rotten Tomatoes, based on 24 reviews.

In 2011, Eco was quoted as giving a mixed review for the adaptation of his novel: "A book like this is a club sandwich, with turkey, salami, tomato, cheese, lettuce. And the movie is obliged to choose only the lettuce or the cheese, eliminating everything else – the theological side, the political side. It's a nice movie."

John Simon stated The Name of the Rose misfired due to its preposterously happy ending.

Awards

 The film was awarded the César Award for Best Foreign Film.
 The film was awarded two BAFTAs: Sean Connery for Best Actor and Hasso von Hugo for Best Make Up Artist.

See also
 List of films based on crime books
 List of historical period drama films
 Middle Ages in film
 Penitenziagite

Notes

References

External links

 
 
 
 

1986 films
1986 drama films
1980s crime drama films
1980s English-language films
1980s historical drama films
1980s mystery thriller films
1980s thriller drama films
20th Century Fox films
BAFTA winners (films)
Best Foreign Film César Award winners
Columbia Pictures films
English-language French films
English-language German films
English-language Italian films
Films about bibliophilia
Films about murder
Films about religion
Films about witchcraft
Films based on crime novels
Films based on Italian novels
Films directed by Jean-Jacques Annaud
Films produced by Bernd Eichinger
Films scored by James Horner
Films set in Italy
Films set in libraries
Films set in monasteries
Films set in religious buildings and structures
Films set in the 14th century
Films with screenplays by Gérard Brach
Films with screenplays by Howard Franklin
French crime drama films
French crime thriller films
French historical drama films
French mystery thriller films
German crime drama films
German crime thriller films
German historical drama films
German mystery thriller films
Historical mystery films
Italian crime drama films
Italian mystery thriller films
Italian historical drama films
The Name of the Rose
Poisoning in film
West German films
1980s Italian films
1980s French films
1980s German films